The Three Rivers Conference is a high school athletic conference in northeast Indiana, consisting of schools in Fulton, Kosciusko, Miami, Wabash, and Whitley counties.

History
The conference was formed in 1971 by independents Caston, Culver, Northfield, and Triton, and former Mid-Indiana Conference (MIC) member North Miami. The conference grew in 1976, as Manchester joined from the Northern Lakes Conference (NLC), Southwood joined from the Mid-Indiana Conference, and two recent consolidations, Whitko (1971) and Tippecanoe Valley (1974) joined. Culver left for the Northern State Conference (NSC) at the same time. This incarnation would last for two years, until Caston left for the Midwest Athletic Conference.

Triton left for the NSC in 1980, and was replaced by two MIC schools: Eastern (Greentown) and Oak Hill. Eastern rejoined the MIC in 1987, and was replaced by NLC school Rochester. The lineup changed once more in 2006, when Oak Hill traded places with Central Indiana Athletic Conference member Wabash. The latest change was in 2015, as Maconaquah and Peru joined from the folding MIC.

Tippecanoe Valley has historically dominated the conference. Rochester and Tippecanoe Valley share a traveling trophy that is called the bell. Tippy holds a winning record against all members of the conference.

Membership

Former members

Football Divisions

Timeline

Sports
 Baseball (boys)
 Basketball
 Cross Country
 Football (boys)
 Golf
 Softball (girls)
 Swimming
 Tennis
 Track & Field
 Wrestling (boys)
 Volleyball (girls)

State Champions

Baseball
Wabash (1986)~
Northfield (2001-2A)
Manchester (2002-2A)
Northfield (2012-2A)

~ Wabash: Current Member of Three Rivers Conference, won title as member of Central Indiana Conference

Football
Tippecanoe Valley (1979-1A)
Oak Hill (1982-1A)~~
Whitko (1986-2A)
Rochester (1987-2A)
North Miami (1993-1A)
Southwood (2002-1A)

~~  Oak Hill: Won title as Member of Three Rivers Conference, current member of Central Indiana Conference

Golf
Rochester (1980)

Track and Field
Rochester (1918)

Wrestling
Wabash (1927)
Wabash (1928)

Softball
North Miami (2014)
Northfield (2021)

Conference Champions

Football

 Culver did not have a football team until after they left the TRC.

Boys Basketball

Girls Volleyball

Girls Basketball

 The champions for 1986-87, 1988–89, 1989–90, and 1992-93 are not verified. Culver left the TRC before girls' competition began.

Boys Swimming & Diving

Girls Swimming & Diving

References

Resources
 Three Rivers Conference
 IHSAA Conferences
 IHSAA Directory
 The Senior Reports - Indiana

Indiana high school athletic conferences
High school sports conferences and leagues in the United States